Peter Poulos (born 7 June 1977) is a Samoan rugby union player. He plays as a flanker.

Career
He played for Orrell R.U.F.C, NTT Docomo Red Hurricanes and London Irish during his club career.
His only international caps for Samoa were during the 2003 Rugby World Cup, where he played four matches.
He retired from player career due to an injury.

Notes

External links

Peter Poulos at L'Équipe

1977 births
Living people
Samoan rugby union players
Samoan expatriate rugby union players
Samoan expatriate sportspeople in Japan
Rugby union flankers
Samoa international rugby union players
Samoan expatriate sportspeople in England
Expatriate rugby union players in Japan
Expatriate rugby union players in England
Orrell R.U.F.C. players
London Irish players
NTT DoCoMo Red Hurricanes Osaka players